A netlabel (also online label, web label, digi label, MP3 label or download label) is a record label that distributes its music through digital audio formats (such as MP3, Ogg Vorbis,  FLAC, or WAV) over the Internet. While similar to traditional record labels in many respects, netlabels typically emphasize free distribution online, often under licenses that encourage works to be shared (e.g., Creative Commons licenses), and artists often retain copyright.

Netlabels may have a considerably lower staff count than traditional record labels, in some instances being only a single individual in control of their music, maintaining sole ownership. Physical LPs, for example, are rarely produced by a netlabel, relying entirely on digital distribution and means of the Internet to provide the product. Having no physical product makes the running costs of a netlabel considerably less than a traditional record label and some netlabels have abandoned any financial model altogether and instead, running the netlabel as a hobby. Some employ guerrilla marketing to promote their work.

History
Online music groups date back almost as far as the history of personal computers, and share close ties with video games and the demoscene. Early music groups released music in MOD formats, typically as part of a music disk, which often included a MOD player, visual effects, and textual information.

Netlabels began to branch out from the tracker scene when the lossy MP3 file format became popular in the late 1990s. Some are still dedicated to electronic music and related genres, though this is rapidly changing and the quality of downloads are getting higher with the use of FLAC downloads offering CD quality uncompressed music. 

Most of the original netlabels have now ceased operations. Only a few of the originators of the movements are still currently active, and releasing in the same format, like Eerik Inpuj Sound, Upitup Records, 50/50innertainment Records, Kahvi Collective, Bedroom Research, Acroplane and Phonocake.

See also
 Demoscene
 FLAC
 Freetekno
 List of music software
 Low bit
 MP3 blog
 Netlabels in Japan
 Open Content
 Riddim
 Street art

References

External links 

 How to Start a Netlabel Wikihow article
 Soundshiva.net Opensource catalogue of netlabels and releases
 Netlabels and democratization of the recording industry Academic article on netlabels
 clongclongmoo Netlabel List overview of active and archived labels
 Netlabel #hot100 Charts 
 Netlabels.org  Resource for netlabel and netaudio culture with screenshots, reviews and releases
 NetlabelArchive.org  A archive site that hosts inactive netlabels
 Limited edition release 2007/2017 quantum-bit.it

Record labels
Music industry
Open content